The Irpin Declaration (Ukrainian: Ірпінська декларація) is a political union between the Freedom of Russia Legion, the National Republican Army and the Russian Volunteer Corps   formed on August 31 2022.

See also
2022 anti-war protests in Russia
2022 Russian businessmen mystery deaths
2022 Russian mystery fires
2022 Russian military commissariats arsons
Combat Organization of Anarcho-Communists
Freedom of Russia Legion
Russian Volunteer Corps
Free Nations of Russia Forum
Russian Insurgent Army
Dzhokhar Dudayev Battalion
Sheikh Mansur Battalion
Kastuś Kalinoŭski Regiment
Pahonia Regiment
Tactical group "Belarus"
Georgian Legion

References

Insurgent groups in Europe
Opposition to Vladimir Putin
Organizations established in 2022
Resistance during the 2022 Russian invasion of Ukraine